The Samara Flag (Samarsko zname, Samarskoye znamya) is an important military symbol of the Bulgarian Army. The flag, woven by local nuns, was given to the Bulgarian volunteers in the Russo-Turkish War of 1877-78 by the citizens of the Russian city of Samara on 18 May 1877. The symbol became well-known after it escaped capture by Ottoman forces at the Battle of Stara Zagora. Many Bulgarian soldiers perished to protect the flag from being captured by the Ottoman forces.

The flag, a tricolour 1.85 × 1.90 m in size, was sewed from silk and contains pan-Slavic colors (red, white, blue). Icons of the Holy Mother of God and Cyril and Methodius were drawn on it in a golden cross by the Saint Petersburg artist Nikolay Simakov. Bearing a silver point designed by Graf Rochefort. The flag, originally intended for the rebels of the April Uprising, was handed to the Bulgarians near Ploieşti on 18 May, having been transported through Chişinău, where it was on 1 May. A delegation from the city of Samara, headed by Efim Kozhevnikov and Pyotr Alabin, handed the Samara flag to the volunteers in a special ceremony, with the flag being nailed using gold nails to its pole. Tseko Petkov, a leader of a band in the Troyan part of the Balkan Mountains, exclaimed:

The flag, entrusted to the 3rd battalion of the Bulgarian volunteer corps, was part of the battles at Stara Zagora and Nova Zagora, where a number of color-bearers perished protecting it (including Lieutenant-Colonel Pavel Kalitin), as well as the Battles of Shipka Pass and Sheynovo.

The Samara flag was initially kept in Radomir, from where its last bearer, Pavel Korchev descended. It was later housed in the royal palace in Sofia (now the National Art Gallery) starting in 1881. In 1946, the flag was transferred to the National Museum of Military History (NMMH). It has remained there ever since, preserved in a chamber under special conditions.

Two copies of the flag were made in 1958, one of which was sent to the Central Military Museum in Russia. Another two were made afterwards, one of which in 1978 in the NMMH restoration workshop by Mihail Maletski. The nuns of the Russian-founded Knyazhevo Nunnery of the Shroud of the Most Holy Mother of God gave the NMMH another precise copy made by them in 2006.

The Samara flag is the only flag that has been awarded the Bulgarian Medal for Bravery, the medal being implanted in its pole's richly decorated point. The flag has been portrayed numerous times by noted artists, the most famous paintings featuring it being arguably The Samara Flag by Jaroslav Věšín from 1911 and Handing of the Samara Flag to the Bulgarian Volunteer Corps in Ploieşti by Nikolay Dmitriev-Orenburgsky.

The Flag Monument of Stara Zagora is a concrete replica of the Samara flag and commemorates the deaths of Bulgarian soldiers in the Russo-Turkısh War of 1877–78.

Gallery

References
 
 

Military history of Bulgaria
Russo-Turkish War (1877–1878)
Historical flags
Samara, Russia
Recipients of the Order of Bravery
Battle of Shipka Pass